Dirección General de Aeronáutica Civil (DGAC), in English the General Directorate of Civil Aeronautics, is the civil aviation authority of Honduras. The headquarters is in Tegucigalpa.

Accident investigations
The agency investigates aircraft accidents and incidents in Honduras. The agency investigated the crash of Central American Airways Flight 731.

Honduran authorities delegated the investigation of the TACA Flight 390 accident at Toncontín International Airport in 2008 to the Salvadoran Civil Aviation Authority in accordance with the Convention on International Civil Aviation.

References

External links

 Dirección General de Aeronáutica Civil 

Government of Honduras
Honduras
Aviation organizations based in Honduras
Organizations investigating aviation accidents and incidents